Joan Myers Brown (born 25 December 1931) is an American dance instructor.

Early life and education
Brown is the only child of Nellie Lewis, a nuclear scientist, and Julius Myers, a chef and restaurateur, born on 25 December 1931 in Philadelphia.  Native to both Philadelphia and North Carolina, she grew up mainly on 47th Street and Paschall Avenue of Southwest Philadelphia.

Brown's first dance instructors and role models were Essie Marie Dorsey, Sydney Gibson King, and Marion Durham Cuyjet.  As a child she wished to shatter the social barriers prohibiting African Americans from becoming famous in the world of dance.

During a time where famous dance personalities were predominantly light-skinned, Brown worked hard to make sure that people of color acquired equal status in mainstream dance.  She dreamed of a school where African Americans could learn and develop through methods tailored specifically to their individual needs - a program that was specially created for ethnic bodies.

Accomplishments 
Brown's accomplishments were many:
 1960: Established The Philadelphia School of Dance Arts
 1970: Founded The Philadelphia Dance Company (more commonly known as Philadanco)
 1988: Founded the International Conference of Black Dance Companies
 1991: Created the International Association of Blacks in Dance (IABD) in 1991
 1995–: Distinguished guest, dance faculty at Howard University

Recognition
 Honored in "Dance Women; Living Legends", a tribute to African-American pioneer women of modern dance
 Brown was one of the recipients of the 2012 National Medal of Arts, by President and Mrs. Obama, in the White House's East Room, on Wednesday, July 10, 2013

References

External links 
 Joan Myers Brown Philadanco papers from the African American Museum in Philadelphia

Living people
American female dancers
American dancers
Howard University faculty
United States National Medal of Arts recipients
American women academics
21st-century American women
1931 births